This is a list of Chernobyl-related articles.

Disaster and effects
 Comparison of Chernobyl and other radioactivity releases
 Comparison of the Chernobyl and Fukushima nuclear accidents
 Chernobyl disaster
 Effects of the Chernobyl disaster
 Chernobyl necklace
 Convention on Early Notification of a Nuclear Accident, adopted in direct response to Chernobyl
 Cultural impact of the Chernobyl nuclear disaster
 Deaths due to the Chernobyl disaster
 Individual involvement in the Chernobyl disaster
 Radiophobia
 Threat of the Dnieper reservoirs

Russo-Ukrainian War
 Battle of Chernobyl

Places and geography

Power plant
 Chernobyl Nuclear Power Plant
 Chernobyl Nuclear Power Plant sarcophagus
 Chernobyl New Safe Confinement

Exclusion zone
 Chernobyl Nuclear Power Plant Exclusion Zone, also known as the Zone of Alienation
 Pripyat, abandoned city
 Chernobyl, semi-abandoned city
 Kopachi, abandoned village
 Poliske, abandoned town
 Red Forest

Other
 Slavutych, city established in 1986 after the disaster
 Elephant's Foot (Chernobyl), an extremely radioactive lump of corium in the reactor

Media

Non-fiction 

 The Bell of Chernobyl, a documentary film
 , a documentary film
 Chernobyl: Consequences of the Catastrophe for People and the Environment, a Russian scientific publication
 Chernobyl Heart, a documentary film
 Chornobyl.3828, a Ukrainian documentary film
 
 The Russian Woodpecker, a documentary film
 TORCH report, a scientific report
 The Truth About Chernobyl, a memoir book
 Voices from Chernobyl: The Oral History of a Nuclear Disaster, a book
 Voices from Chernobyl, a documentary film
 White Horse, a documentary film

Fiction 

 Aurora, a 2006 film
 Call of Duty 4: Modern Warfare, a video game
 Chernobyl, a 2019 TV series
 Chernobyl, a novel by Frederik Pohl
 Chernobyl: Abyss, a 2021 Russian disaster film
 Chernobyl Diaries, a 2012 disaster horror film
 Chernobyl: Zone of Exclusion, a Russian TV series
 Chernobylite, a 2021 science fiction survival video game
 , a 1990 Soviet film
 , a 2017 film
 , a 2015 film
 , a film
 Stalking the Atomic City. Life among the decadent and the depraved of Chornobyl, a novel by Markiyan Kamysh about illegal trips to Chernobyl
 
 , a film
 S.T.A.L.K.E.R: Shadow of Chernobyl, a video game
 Wolves Eat Dogs, a novel by Martin Cruz Smith

Organizations 
 Bellesrad
 Chernobyl Children's Project International
 Chernobyl Forum
 Chernobyl Recovery and Development Programme
 Chernobyl Shelter Fund
 Commission for Independent Research and Information on Radioactivity
 Friends of Chernobyl's Children
 List of Chernobyl-related charities
 Ukrainian National Chornobyl Museum

People
 Individual involvement in the Chernobyl disaster
 Alexander Akimov, block 4 shift leader
 Yury Bandazhevsky, Belarusian scientist who was jailed 4 years possibly because of his investigations on Chernobyl's consequences
 Viktor Bryukhanov, plant director
 Anatoly Dyatlov, plant vice chief engineer, the test supervisor
 Elena Filatova, Ukrainian photographer known for her website, containing a photo-essay of purported solo motorcycle rides through Chernobyl's zone of alienation
 Nikolai Fomin, plant chief engineer
 Vasily Ignatenko, firefighter
 Valery Khodemchuk, shift circulating pump operator
 Viktor Kibenok, firefighter shift leader
 Valeri Legasov, chief of the investigation committee of the Chernobyl disaster
 Liquidator (Chernobyl), people who took part in the liquidation of the consequences of the disaster
 Vassili Nesterenko, physicist from Belarus involved as a liquidator, and working on the consequences of the Chernobyl disaster
 Vladimir Pikalov, headed the Chemical Troops of the USSR, on-scene military commander
 Volodymyr Pravyk, firefighter
 Adi Roche, chief executive of the charity Chernobyl Children International
 Boris Shcherbina, Deputy Chairman of the Council of Ministers of the USSR, supervised the crisis management
 Wladimir Tchertkoff, Journalist who made documentary films featuring the liquidators
 Leonid Telyatnikov, firefighter, head of the plant fire department
 Leonid Toptunov, shift reactor control engineer

Other
 Chernobyl Way
 Chernobylite
 Children of Chernobyl Benefit Concert

See also
Environmental effects of nuclear power
Nuclear power debate
List of civilian nuclear accidents
 List of books about the Chernobyl disaster
List of books about nuclear issues

References

Environment of Ukraine
Ukraine history-related lists
Belarus history-related lists
Soviet Union-related lists
Nuclear technology-related lists
Chernobyl